Mac L. Percival (born February 26, 1940) is a former American football placekicker in the National Football League (NFL) for the Chicago Bears and Dallas Cowboys. He played college basketball at Texas Tech University.

Early years
Percival attended Vernon High School. He used a straight-away style as one of the kickers for the football team, but was only involved in kickoffs and extra points. He also lettered in basketball, which was his main sport.

He accepted a basketball scholarship from Texas Tech University, but did not play football during his time in college.

Professional career

Dallas Cowboys (first stint)
In the Sixties, the Dallas Cowboys employed a kicking caravan search to unearth potential kickers. Percival was signed as an undrafted free agent after the 1967 NFL Draft, based on his performance in one of those searches, even though he never played a down of college football and that he had spent four years after college as a high school teacher.

On September 6, he was traded along with tight end Austin Denney to the Chicago Bears in exchange for a third round draft choice (#71-Ed Harmon).

Chicago Bears
In 1967, the Chicago Bears acquired Percival to replace kicker Roger LeClerc. In his rookie season, he made 13 out of 26 field goals after appearing in 14 games.

In 1968, with the coaching help of Ben Agajanian, he refined his technique and went on to make 25 out of 36 field goals, while scoring 100 points and becoming only the third player in franchise history to achieve that mark in a season. He is also the last Bears kicker to make five field goals in a game, which he accomplished against the Philadelphia Eagles on October 10, during a 29–16 win.

During his tenure with the Bears, he made 99 out of 182 field goals (54.4%) and scored 456 points.

Dallas Cowboys (second stint)
On September 10, 1974, he was acquired by the Dallas Cowboys to replace George Hunt. He only lasted three games before being replaced by Efren Herrera.

Free kick
In 1968, the Bears were facing their longtime rival Green Bay Packers. With :26 remaining in the game with the score tied at 10–10, Bears returner Cecil Turner fair-caught a Packers punt at the Packers 43-yard line. The Bears decided to kick the game-winning kick as a fair catch kick, which has rarely been done before. Percival was able to make the 43-yarder to win the game. The kick was Percival's second game-winner, as he kicked a 47-yarder with :03 left against their rival in Minnesota to give the Bears a 26–24 win at Wrigley Field the week before.

Four years later in a 1972 exhibition game against the Houston Oilers, Percival once again attempted a free kick. However, this time, the kick, which was 50 yards, missed. The Bears still won 20–17.

References

External links
Bears Getting a Boot Out of Percival
Percival is not hen-pecked, but he listens to his wife

1940 births
Living people
People from Vernon, Texas
People from Garland, Texas
Players of American football from Texas
American football placekickers
Texas Tech Red Raiders basketball players
Dallas Cowboys players
Chicago Bears players
American men's basketball players